The Great St. Trinian's Train Robbery is a British comedy film, directed by Frank Launder and Sidney Gilliat, written by Sidney and Leslie Gilliat, and released on 4 April 1966. It is the last of the original series of films based on the St Trinian's School set of images and comics, and the only one to be produced in colour. The film stars a selection of actors from previous films in the series, including George Cole, Richard Wattis, Eric Barker, Michael Ripper, and Raymond Huntley, alongside Frankie Howerd, Reg Varney, Dora Bryan, and the voice of Stratford Johns.

The film's story focuses on St Trinian's becoming caught up in a train robbery, after the gang who conducted it attempts to reclaim their loot from the building that the students and teachers now inhabit. The story itself is based on the actual Great Train Robbery that took place in 1963, and includes numerous parodies of the technocratic ideas of the Harold Wilson government and its support of the comprehensive school system, and spoof elements based upon those from the James Bond spy films of the Sixties.

Plot
Gang leader "Alphonse" Askett, who operates under the guise of a hairdresser, is contacted by his anonymous employer, a secret mastermind, on a plan for a major train robbery. The gang are instructed to rob a mail van of £2.5 million, and hide the loot at Hamingwell Grange, a deserted country mansion, until it is safe to reclaim it. Meanwhile, Amber Spottiswood, the headmistress of St Trinian's, has an affair with Sir Horace, the new head of the Ministry of Schools (a fictional government department) and a corrupt politician, who recently took over following a Labour Party election triumph. Much to his department staff's shock, he willingly provides the school a grant in order to relocate following a fire at their previous building. St Trinian's moves into Hamingwell as a result, which subsequently spook Askett's gang when they attempt to return to recover their loot.

Learning of what happened, the gang's mastermind instructs Askett to find a means to retrieve the stolen money without raising suspicions from the school. Askett decides on sending his delinquent daughters into St Trinian's as new pupils, instructing the pair to gather any useful information that the gang can make use of. Unknown to Askett, one of the students at St Trinian's comes across some of the stolen money and brings it to Flash Harry, the school's turf accountant. Discovering it is part of the proceeds from the train robbery reported in the papers, he decides to claim the reward money from Edward Noakes, an insurance assessor. However, Noakes is put off by the secretive manner Harry conducts the meeting under, and decides to keep St Trinian's under observation instead.

The gang soon receive instructions to take advantage of an upcoming Parents' Day at the school, and pose as caterers in order to recover the money. Whilst waiting for the school to be preoccupied with a dance routine in the main hall, the gang lose a camera to one of the students, housing a hidden two-way radio. When the camera is brought to Harry in order to be fenced, he and some of the students intercept a message for Askett from the mastermind and realise the train robbers are in the school. The gang manage to recover the stolen money and escape, just as the school is alerted to what is happening; while Harry and the students chase after the gang, Spottiswood leads the teachers in hopes of claiming the reward money.

A chaotic chase with trains soon ensues. While the gang use a stolen train to make their escape, the students commandeer a passenger train to pursue them, and subsequently seize a van car from them carrying the stolen money. At the same time, police are alerted by Noakes, and commandeer another passenger train to pursue both. The students swiftly manage to evade the robbers and leave them being chased by the police, with the gang cornered at a station. While officers arrest most of the gang, Askett manages to escape in the chaos. Meanwhile, the students bring the stolen money to a station further up the railway line, planning to claim it for themselves, but are prevented from doing so by the arrival of more police. However, the officers applaud the girls for recovering it, causing the students to be awarded with medals, much to the shock of others that know them too well.

Cast

Frankie Howerd as "Alphonse of Monte Carlo" / Alfred Askett
Dora Bryan as headmistress Amber Spottiswood
George Cole as Flash Harry
Reg Varney as Gilbert
Raymond Huntley as Sir Horace, the Minister
Richard Wattis as Mr Manton Bassett
Portland Mason as Georgina
Terry Scott as Policeman
Eric Barker as Mr Culpepper Brown
Godfrey Winn as Truelove
Colin Gordon as Edward Noakes, the Insurance Assessor
Desmond Walter-Ellis as Leonard Edwards
Arthur Mullard as Big Jim
Norman Mitchell as William
Cyril Chamberlain as Maxie
Larry Martyn as Chips
Peter Gilmore as Butters
Leon Thau as Fordbridge porter
Michael Ripper as The Liftman at the Ministry
Stratford Johns as The Voice
Jeremy Clyde as Monty
George Benson as Gore-Blackwood
William Kendall as Mr Parker
Maureen Crombie as Marcia Askett
Susan Jones as Lavinia Askett
Barbara Couper as Mabel Radnage, the deputy headmistress
Elspeth Duxbury as Veronica Bledlow, the Maths mistress
Carole Ann Ford as Albertine, the French mistress
Margaret Nolan as Susie Naphill (The scene where Nolan performs the strip is based on an original performance she did in a Soho nightclub, with the music by the John Barry Seven), the Art mistress
Maggie Rennie as Magda O'Riley, the Games mistress
Jean St Clair as Drunken Dolly, the Music mistress
Jonathan Cecil as Alfred Askett's last customer before closing (uncredited) 
Guy Standeven as Sir Horace's Chauffeur (uncredited)
Schoolgirls (uncredited):
Ingrid Boulting  
Sally Geeson 
Sally-Jane Spencer
Michelle Scott

Desmond Walter-Ellis died in 1994 aged 80. Jeremy Clyde and Carole Ann Ford are the last two surviving credited adult stars as of 2022.

Filming notes

The railway scenes were filmed on the former Longmoor Military Railway (closed in 1969). In the final railway scene where the girls 'return' the money the British Railways station at Liss can be seen in the background.

The locomotives used were:

Longmoor Military Railway WD Austerity 2-10-0 AD601 'Kitchener' as the express locomotive in mock-up green livery and carrying a fake BR-pattern numberplate on the smokebox door until its scrapping in 1967.
Two Ministry of Supply "Austerity" 0-6-0ST Tank Engines, one of which was mocked up to resemble a J50 and temporarily renumbered 68961, but in reality was WD157 Constantine (this locomotive was scrapped in 1968 by Pollock Brown at Southampton), the other one, WD196 Errol Lonsdale, painted black and given the number 68011. Errol Lonsdale was later saved for preservation, spending time at the Kent & East Sussex Railway, the Mid Hants Railway, and the South Devon Railway, but is now at Stoomcentrum Maldegem.
One LMS diesel shunter {BR Class 11} in Longmoor colours.
A DEMU in BR livery as the commuter train commandeered by the police (number 1102, Class 205).
A Wickham trolley used in the school staff's attempt to join the chase.
A pump action Handcar used by two junior girls to switch trains between tracks.

The extras on board the St Trinian's train were pupils from a local convent school. In addition, the school used for much of the filming was Little Abbey Preparatory School, near Liss. The school was in fact the other side of the moor from Longmoor. This was previously a boys preparatory school based at Burghclere near Newbury, which had merged with a girls preparatory school at the location at Liss nine months prior to the making of the film

Reception
The film was among the 15 most popular films at the British box office in 1966.

References

External links

 St Trinian's Net

1966 films
1960s crime comedy films
British crime comedy films
British sequel films
British heist films
Films directed by Frank Launder
Films directed by Sidney Gilliat
Films scored by Malcolm Arnold
Films set in schools
Rail transport films
Films with screenplays by Frank Launder and Sidney Gilliat
St Trinian's films
1960s heist films
1966 comedy films
1960s English-language films
1960s British films